The Cortez rainbow wrasse (Thalassoma lucasanum) is a species of wrasse native to the eastern Pacific Ocean from Baja California to Peru, as well as around the Galapagos Islands. It is generally very common. It can also be found in the aquarium trade. This species can reach  in total length. It feeds on small organisms such as crustaceans, plankton and fish eggs, and the young are cleaner fish.

References

External links
 

Cortez rainbow wrasse
Fish described in 1862